Goodenia muelleriana is a species of flowering plant in the family Goodeniaceae and is endemic to the north-west of Western Australia. It is an ascending to erect herb with elliptic to lance-shaped leaves at the base of the plant, and racemes of yellow flowers.

Description

Taxonomy and naming
Goodenia muelleriana was first formally described in 1990 Roger Charles Carolin in the journal Telopea from a specimen he collected near Tom Price in 1970. The specific epithet (muelleriana) honours Ferdinand von Mueller.

Distribution and habitat
This goodenia grows in sandy or stony soil in the Gascoyne, Little Sandy Desert and Pilbara biogeographic regions in the north-west of Western Australia.

Conservation status
Goodenia muelleriana is classified as "not threatened" by the Government of Western Australia Department of Parks and Wildlife.

References

muelleriana
Eudicots of Western Australia
Plants described in 1990
Taxa named by Roger Charles Carolin
Endemic flora of Australia